Experimental rock, also called avant-rock, is a subgenre of rock music that pushes the boundaries of common composition and performance technique or which experiments with the basic elements of the genre. Artists aim to liberate and innovate, with some of the genre's distinguishing characteristics being improvisational performances, avant-garde influences, odd instrumentation, opaque lyrics (or instrumentals), unorthodox structures and rhythms, and an underlying rejection of commercial aspirations.

From its inception, rock music was experimental, but it was not until the late 1960s that rock artists began creating extended and complex compositions through advancements in multitrack recording. In 1967, the genre was as commercially viable as pop music, but by 1970, most of its leading players had incapacitated themselves in some form. In Germany, the krautrock subgenre merged elements of improvisation and psychedelic rock with electronic music, avant-garde and contemporary classical pieces. Later in the 1970s,  significant musical crossbreeding took place in tandem with the developments of punk and new wave, DIY experimentation, and electronic music. Funk, jazz-rock, and fusion rhythms also became integrated into experimental rock music.

Early 1980s experimental rock groups had few direct precedents for their sound. Later in the decade, avant-rock pursued a psychedelic aesthetic that differed from the self-consciousness and vigilance of earlier post-punk. During the 1990s, a loose movement known as post-rock became the dominant form of experimental rock. As of the 2010s, the term "experimental rock" has fallen to indiscriminate use, with many modern rock bands being categorized under prefixes such as "post-", "kraut-", "psych-", "art-", "prog-", "avant-" and "noise-".

History

1960s–1970s

Although experimentation had always existed in rock music, it was not until the late 1960s that new openings were created from the aesthetic intersecting with the social. In 1966, the boundaries between pop music and the avant-garde began to blur as rock albums were conceived and executed as distinct, extended statements. Self-taught rock musicians in the middle and late 1960s drew from the work of composers such as John Cage, Karlheinz Stockhausen, and Luciano Berio. Academic Bill Martin writes: "in the case of imitative painters, what came out was almost always merely derivative, whereas in the case of rock music, the result could be quite original, because assimilation, synthesis, and imitation are integral parts of the language of rock."

Martin says that the advancing technology of multitrack recording and mixing boards were more influential to experimental rock than electronic instruments such as the synthesizer, allowing the Beatles and the Beach Boys to become the first crop of non-classically trained musicians to create extended and complex compositions. Drawing from the influence of George Martin, the Beatles' producer, and the Beach Boys' Brian Wilson, music producers after the mid-1960s began to view the recording studio as an instrument used to aid the process of composition. When the Beach Boys' Pet Sounds (1966) was released to a four-month chart stay in the British top 10, many British groups responded to the album by making more experimental use of recording studio techniques.

In the late 1960s, groups such as the Mothers of Invention, the Velvet Underground, the Fugs, the Monks, Red Krayola, Soft Machine, Pink Floyd and the Beatles began incorporating elements of avant-garde music, sound collage, and poetry in their work. Historian David Simonelli writes that, further to the Beatles' "Tomorrow Never Knows" (Revolver, 1966), the band's February 1967 double A-side single, pairing "Strawberry Fields Forever" with "Penny Lane", "establish[ed] the Beatles as the most avant-garde [rock] composers of the postwar era". Aside from the Beatles, author Doyle Greene identifies Frank Zappa, the Velvet Underground, Plastic Ono Band, Captain Beefheart & His Magic Band, Pink Floyd, the Soft Machine and Nico as "pioneers of avant-rock". In addition, The Quietus Ben Graham described duos the Silver Apples and Suicide as antecedents of avant-rock. Pitchfork cited Red Krayola as being "likely the most experimental band of the 1960s" on their review of God Bless the Red Krayola and All Who Sail With It.

In the opinion of Stuart Rosenberg, the first "noteworthy" experimental rock group was the Mothers of Invention, led by composer Frank Zappa. Greene recognises the group's debut album, Freak Out!, as marking the "emergence of the 'avant-rock' studio album" at a time when Warhol's presentation of the Velvet Underground's shows was redefining the parameters of a rock concert. According to author Kelly Fisher Lowe, Zappa "set the tone" for experimental rock with the way he incorporated "countertextural aspects ... calling attention to the very recordedness of the album". This was reflected in other contemporary experimental rock LPs, such as the Beach Boys' Pet Sounds and Smile, the Who's The Who Sell Out (1967) and Tommy (1969), and the Beatles' Sgt. Pepper's Lonely Hearts Club Band (1967). The Velvet Underground were a "groundbreaking group in experimental rock", according to Rosenberg, "even further out of step with popular culture than the early recordings of the Mothers of Invention". The band were playing experimental rock in 1965 before other significant countercultural rock scenes had developed, pioneering avant-rock through their integration of minimalist rock and avant-garde ideas.

The Beatles' album Sgt. Pepper's inspired a new consideration for experimental rock as commercially viable music. Once the group released their December 1967 film Magical Mystery Tour, author Barry Faulk writes, "pop music and experimental rock were [briefly] synonymous, and the Beatles stood at the apex of a progressive movement in musical capitalism". The musical passage recorded by the Doors in 1968, "Not to Touch the Earth", is what critic Mick Wall described as "nearly four minutes of avant-rock." As progressive rock developed, experimental rock acquired notoriety alongside art rock.  By 1970, most of the musicians which had been at the forefront of experimental rock had incapacitated themselves. From then on, the ideas and work of British artist and former Roxy Music member Brian Eno—which suggested that ideas from the art world, including those of experimental music and the avant-garde, should be deployed in the context of experimental rock—were a key innovation throughout the decade.

Krautrock

In the late 1960s and early 1970s, Germany's "krautrock" scene (also referred to as kosmische or elektronische musik) saw bands develop a form of experimental rock that drew on rock sources, such as the Velvet Underground and Frank Zappa, as well as wider avant-garde influences. Groups such as Can, Faust, Neu!, Amon Düül II, Ash Ra Tempel, Kraftwerk, Tangerine Dream, and Popol Vuh merged elements of psychedelic rock with electronic music, funk rhythms, jazz improvisation, and avant-garde and contemporary classical compositions, as well as new electronic instrumentation. The ideas of minimalism and composers such as Stockhausen would be particularly influential. The movement was partly born out of the student movements of 1968, as German youth sought a unique countercultural identity and wanted to develop a form of German music that was distinct from the mainstream music of the period.

Late 1970s–present

The late 1970s post-punk movement was devised as a break with rock tradition, exploring new possibilities by embracing electronics, noise, jazz and the classical avant-garde, and the production methods of dub and disco. During this era, funk, jazz-rock, and fusion rhythms became integrated into experimental rock music. Some groups who were categorized as "post-punk" considered themselves part of an experimental rock trajectory, with This Heat as one of the prominent players. The late 1970s no wave scene consisted of New York experimental rock bands that aimed to break with new wave, and who, according to Village Voice writer Steve Anderson, pursued an abrasive reductionism which "undermined the power and mystique of a rock vanguard by depriving it of a tradition to react against." Anderson claims that the no wave scene represented "New York’s last stylistically cohesive avant-rock movement."

The early 1980s would see avant-rock develop significantly following the punk and new wave, DIY experimentation, electronic music, and musical cross-breeding of the previous decade, according to Pitchfork. Dominique Leone of Pitchfork claims that the first wave of 1980s experimental rock groups, including acts such as Material, the Work, This Heat, Ornette Coleman's Prime Time, James Blood Ulmer, Last Exit, and Massacre, had few direct precedents for their sound. Steve Redhead noted the resuscitation of New York's avant-rock scene, including artists such as Sonic Youth and John Zorn, in the 1980s. According to journalist David Stubbs, "no other major rock group [...] has done as much to try to bridge the gap between rock and the avant garde" as Sonic Youth, who drew on improvisation and noise as well as the Velvet Underground.

In the late 1980s, avant-rock pursued a "frazzled, psychedelia-tinged, 'blissed out'" aesthetic that differed from the self-consciousness and vigilance of earlier post-punk.  The UK shoegaze scene was seen by some as a continuation of an experimental rock tradition. Pitchfork described contemporary acts My Bloody Valentine, Spacemen 3, and the Jesus and Mary Chain as "avant-rock icons." According to Paul Hegarty and Martin Halliwell, some 1980s and early 1990s avant-rock acts such as the British musicians David Sylvian and Talk Talk returned to the ideas of progressive rock, which they call "post-progressive". During the 1990s, a loose movement known as post-rock became the dominant form of experimental rock. In a reaction against traditional rock music formula, post-rock artists combined standard rock instrumentation with electronics and influences from styles such as ambient music, IDM, krautrock, minimalism, and jazz. In 2015, The Quietus Bryan Brussee noted uncertainty with the term "experimental rock", and that "it seems like every rock band today has some kind of post-, kraut-, psych-, or noise- prefixed to their genre."

Footnotes

References

Bibliography

Further reading
 
 

 
American rock music genres
Experimental music genres
20th-century music genres
Progressive music